Braybrook or Braybrooke may refer to:

 Braybrooke (surname)
 Baron Braybrooke
 Braybrooke, a village in Northamptonshire, England
 Braybrooke, an electoral ward of Hastings, England
 Braybrook, a suburb of Melbourne, Victoria, Australia